Kosmos 1382 ( meaning Cosmos 1382) was a Soviet US-K missile early warning satellite which was launched in 1982 as part of the Soviet military's Oko programme. The satellite was designed to identify missile launches using optical telescopes and infrared sensors.

Kosmos 1382 was launched from Site 43/3 at Plesetsk Cosmodrome in the Russian SSR. A Molniya-M carrier rocket with a 2BL upper stage was used to perform the launch, which took place at 02:28 UTC on 25 June 1982. The launch successfully placed the satellite into a molniya orbit. It subsequently received its Kosmos designation, and the international designator 1982-064A. The United States Space Command assigned it the Satellite Catalog Number 13295.

See also

 1982 in spaceflight
 List of Kosmos satellites (1251–1500)
 List of Oko satellites
 List of R-7 launches (1980-1984)

References

Kosmos satellites
Oko
Spacecraft launched in 1982
Spacecraft launched by Molniya-M rockets